Phoxinus  apollonicus is a species of small cyprinid fish from Montenegro and Albania.

References

apollonicus
Taxa named by Pier Giorgio Bianco
Taxa named by Salvatore De Bonis
Fish described in 2015